Mayurbhanj State (or Morbhanj) was one of the princely states of India during the period of the British Raj. It was one of the largest states of the Eastern States Agency and one of the three states of the Bengal States Agency. The emblem of the state were two peacocks for according to legend the ancestors of the ancient rulers originated from a peafowl's eyes.

The state included a vast mountainous area inhabited by many different people groups such as the Santal, Munda, Ho and Kisan people. Its former territory lies in the present-day state of Odisha, bordering West Bengal. The capital of the state was the town of Baripada since the 15th century and Daspur was another important town. Large tracts of Mayurbhanj State were covered with forest.

History

 
The rulers of Mayurbhanj state were descendants of the Bhanj dynasty of the Khijjinga mandala of the ancient local Kshatriya lineage. According to the early inscriptions of Ranabhanja and Rajabhanja, the dynasty has its origins from the mythical peahen likely pointing out to the early peafowl related traditions of the Ancient Bhanja clans which is observed on their emblems which is also shared by the successive branches.

Their influence likely declined with the dominance of the Somavamshis in the Utkal region but centuries later came back to prominence in the region with the rise of the Eastern Ganga dynasty after uniting the three realms of Trikalinga with the Bhanjas as their feudatories. Traditions point to numerous origins of the dynasty but lack of records renders them unlikely although it is generally accepted that the founder, Adi Bhanja of the 12th century established the current dynasty of the Mayurbhanj state with his brother Jyoti Bhanja founding the Keonjhar State succeeding from the Khijjinga Adi Bhanja  dynasty.

Mayurbhanj State had been under Maratha rule during the 18th century and became a British protectorate in 1829, many years after the Third Anglo-Maratha War.
During the British Raj the kings of Mayurbhanj pioneered the upliftment of the region. Under their enlightened rule Mayurbhanj became one of the most progressive areas. The Bhanj kings established the first medical college of the state in Cuttack, donating funds and land for the establishment of higher education institutions such as Ravenshaw College and welfare schemes, such as the one undertaken by the Evangelical Missionary Society of Mayurbhanj (EMSM), established in 1895 at the instance of Maharaja Sriram Chandra Bhanj Deo. Mayurbhanj Palace was built by Maharani Sumitra Devi Bhanj Deo in 1804.

The Mayurbhanj State Railway was started by the erstwhile ruler of Mayurbhanj Maharaja Shri Sriram Chandra Bhanj Deo. The first section of 52 km from Rupsa to Baripada railway station being opened for traffic on 20 January 1905.

After the independence of India, Mayurbhanj state under Maharaja Pratap Chandra Bhanjdeo acceded to the Indian Union on 1 January 1949 and was merged with Orissa Province, which became later the state of Odisha.

Rulers
The rulers of Mayurbhanj State of the Bhanj dynasty. They were entitled to a 9 gun salute. The rulers of Mayurbhanj are;

Succession from the Khijjinga mandala Bhanjas (8th–10th cen)
Adi Bhanja of Mayurbhanj
Santai Bhanja
Chakkai Bhanja
Lakshmana Bhanja
Kalpi Bhanja
Surjya Bhanja
Ramachandra Bhanja
Batuli Bhanja
Iswanath Bhanja
Jagannath Bhanja
Nilakantha Bhanja
Baidyanath Bhanjadeba (1556–1600)
Jagannath Bhanjadeba (1600-1643)
Harihara Bhanjadeba (1643–1668)
Sarvesvara Bhanjdeba (1688–1711)
Viravikramaditya Bhanjadeba (1711–1728)
Raghunath Bhanjadeba (1728–1750)
Chakradhar Bhanjadeba (1750–1761)
Damodar Bhanjadeba (1761–1796)
Rani Sumitra Devi (f) - Regent of Mayurbhanj (1796–1810)
Rani Jamuna Devi  (f) - Regent of Mayurbhanj (1810-1813)
Tribikram Bhanja Deo (1813–1822)
Jadunath Bhanja Deo (1822–1863)
Shrinath Bhanja Deo (1863–1868) 
Krushna Chandra Bhanja Deo (1868–29 May 1882)
Sriram Chandra Bhanja Deo (29 May 1882– 22 February 1912)
Purna Chandra Bhanja Deo (22 February 1912–21 April 1928)
Pratap Chandra Bhanja Deo (21 Apr 1928–1 January 1949)

Titular
Pratap Chandra Bhanja Deo (1 January 1949–1968)
Pradeep Chandra Bhanja Deo (1968–15 September 2000)
Praveen Chandra Bhanja Deo (15 September 2000–current)

See also
Mayurbhanj Palace
Mayurbhanj State Railway
Shri Ramachandra Bhanj Medical College
Eastern States Agency
Political integration of India

External Link

 "Indian royal princesses transform family palace into hotel dubbed 'a living museum'.  The Belgadia Palace is located in the princely province of Mayurbhanj, in the country's eastern Odisha state". By Neeta Lal, "The National", Nov. 4, 2021

References

External links

Mayurbhanj palace wallows in royal neglect

Princely states of Odisha
Mayurbhanj district
Bengal Presidency
12th-century establishments in India
1949 disestablishments in India